Sackett v. Environmental Protection Agency may refer to either of two United States Supreme Court cases:

 Sackett v. Environmental Protection Agency (2012) (alternatively called Sackett I), 570 U.S. 205 (2013), a case in which the Court ruled that orders issued by the EPA under the Clean Water Act are subject to the Administrative Procedure Act.
 Sackett v. Environmental Protection Agency (2023) (alternatively called Sackett II), case 21-454, a case in which the Court will consider the scope of the EPA's authority to regulate the waters of the United States.

See also 
 List of United States Supreme Court cases
 Lists of United States Supreme Court cases by volume